Ujamaa Place is a non-profit organization that was launched in 2009 to fill a gap in social welfare programming and services for African-American men between the ages of 17 and 28 in St. Paul, Minnesota. Ujamaa Place took over the services offered by a previous form of the program, Awali Place, when Awali lost its funding due to 2009 budget cuts. Ujamaa Place received its non-profit status in 2010.

History
In 2009, a group of leaders in the St. Paul African-American community, including the St. Paul Chief of Police John Harrington, executive director of the St. Paul YWCA Billy Collins, St. Paul City Council Member Melvin Carter III, Thad Wilderson, Mary K. Boyd, the NAACP, and several members of the Black Ministerial Alliance and the Council on Black Minnesotans, identified that there was a significant gap in social welfare delivery system and programming for this population in Saint Paul, which needed immediate attention. The organizers realized that without intervention from a program like Ujamaa Place, this would be a “lost generation” of young men who die at a young age or are incarcerated for most of their lives.

A similar program to Ujamaa Place was developed by Twin Cities RISE! (TCR!) and piloted in St. Paul in 2008 and part of 2009. In 2009, TCR! determined that the program (Awali Place) would be part of a budget reduction since it was not closely aligned with their core mission. A group of concerned citizens (several of whom are mentioned above) decided to work together to establish Ujamaa Place to further develop the program and build on the good work conducted within the Awali Place program. Ujamaa Place received 501(c)(3) nonprofit status in April 2010, and opened its doors at 1885 University Avenue in St. Paul in November 2010.

Program

Ujamaa Place programming is made available at no cost to participants, but it is a program that demands mutual accountability. It helps men develop the skills it takes to be a successful individual, father, employee, and citizen.

Trained coaches develop high-context relationships that are individualized for each participant, rather than applying a prescribed approach to all. Coaches have often overcome similar obstacles in their own lives, providing inspiration and models of empowerment for participants.

To graduate from the program, an Ujamaa Place participant must demonstrate job skills, empowerment skills and life skills through the following:
Completion of his GED
Demonstrated use of Empowerment Skills in his daily life
Remained drug-free
No recent criminal offenses
Secured stable housing
Held a job for a minimum of three months

Ujamaa Place is not a holding place, but a place of new beginnings and transition. Graduates continue to successfully hold jobs and are enrolled in job training programs in which they gain the skills necessary to secure high skill jobs with benefits.

Board of directors
Mary K. Boyd, Saint Paul Public Schools (retired)
Billy Collins, YWCA Saint Paul
John Couchman, The Saint Paul Foundation (retired)
John Harrington, Minnesota Senate
Rick Heydinger, Public Strategies Group (retired)
Jim Miller, Ecolab
Bill Sands, Western Bancshares, Inc.
Bill Svrluga, WJS Consulting Group
Reverend David Van Dyke, House of Hope Presbyterian Church
Reverend Carl Walker, Morningstar Missionary Baptist Church
Thad Wilderson, Thad Wilderson & Associates
Otis Zanders, Minnesota Department of Corrections (retired)

Development Strategy Committee
Ellen Brown, The Brown Partners, Inc.
Pat Cook, Minnesota Public Radio (retired)
Terry Crowley, Crowley, White & Helmer, Inc. (retired)
Joseph Ellis, Wells Fargo
John Harrington, Minnesota Senate
Rick Heydinger, Public Strategies Group (retired)
Jim Miller, Ecolab
Bill Sands, Western Bancshares, Inc.
Bill Svrluga, WJS Consulting Group
Otis Zanders, Minnesota Department of Corrections (retired)

References

Chao Xiong, "Place for a second chance marks its first anniversary", Star Tribune, St. Paul, December 6, 2011.

External links
 

2009 establishments in Minnesota
Non-profit organizations based in Minnesota